Monica Puig was the defending champion, but lost in the first round to Samantha Stosur.

Third-seeded Stosur went on to win the title, defeating Kristina Mladenovic in the final, 3–6, 6–2, 6–3.

Seeds

Draw

Finals

Top half

Bottom half

Qualifying

Seeds
The top two seeds and Océane Dodin received a bye into the qualifying competition.

Qualifiers

Lucky losers

Draw

First qualifier

Second qualifier

Third qualifier

Fourth qualifier

Fifth qualifier

Sixth qualifier

References
Main Draw
Qualifying Draw

Internationaux de Strasbourgandnbsp;- Singles
2015 Singles
2015 in French tennis